Astika is a brewery making a blond pilsner with an alcohol content of 5% ABV in the city of Haskovo, in southern Bulgaria.

The brand has a leading position in the Bulgarian premium segment. The brewery draws on the best deep-lying water in Thrace. Astika is characterised by a pale golden hue, a long-lasting white foam, and a taste which balances a slightly honey like flavour with a soft bitterness.

Astika, together with market leader Kamenitza, was one of many Bulgarian breweries owned by InBev. In mid October 2009, private equity fund CVC Capital Partners bought all of Anheuser–Busch InBev's holdings in Central Europe for €2.23 billion. They renamed the operations StarBev. In 2012, the Molson Coors Brewing Company bought StarBev.

References

External links
 Astika brand by Molson Coors

Molson Coors Beverage Company
Breweries in Bulgaria
Haskovo